Coleophora achaenivora is a moth of the family Coleophoridae. It is found in Spain, France, Germany and Austria.

The larvae feed on Casignetella species.

References

achaenivora
Moths described in 1877
Moths of Europe